Oneta is one of 6 parishes in the municipality of Villayón, in Asturias, Spain.

Geography

Oneta is a village with 135 inhabitants (2007) and an area of 9,84 km². At an altitude of 542m., The village is 6 km from the municipal capital Villayón.

Rivers and lakes
Famous Waterfalls - Cascada de Oneta.
The River Brana flows through the village.

Transport
The nearest airport is Oviedo

Economy
Agriculture dominates the region and has for hundreds of years.

Climate
Warm summers and mild, occasionally hard winters. Autumn is characterized by severe storms.

Points of interest

 The Oneta Waterfall

Smaller villages in the parish
 Oneta - 77 Hab. (2007) 
 Brañuas (Vaqueiros) - 44 Hab. (2007) 
 Linera - 14 Hab. (2007))

References
Populationsdata > INE

External links
 Citypage
  Asturian Map

Towns in Spain
Parishes in Villayón
Towns in Asturias